Robert John Bell (22 July 1950 – 5 September 2001) was an Australian politician.

Born in Hobart, he was educated at the University of Tasmania and the University of New England before becoming a teacher and youth employment co-ordinator. He was later an electorate assistant and served on Hobart City Council. In 1990, he was appointed to the Australian Senate as a Democrat Senator for Tasmania, filling the casual vacancy caused by the resignation of Norm Sanders. He held the seat until his defeat in 1996.

Bell died in 2001.

References

University of Tasmania alumni
Australian Democrats members of the Parliament of Australia
Members of the Australian Senate for Tasmania
Members of the Australian Senate
1950 births
2001 deaths
20th-century Australian politicians